Herman Frank Cash (July 25, 1918 – February 7, 1994) was a suspected fourth conspirator in the 16th Street Baptist Church bombing of 1963 along with Thomas Edwin Blanton Jr., Robert Edward Chambliss, and Bobby Frank Cherry, all of whom received prison sentences for their involvement in the incident. Cash died in 1994 and was never tried for his alleged involvement in the bombing.

Life
Cash was married to Myrtle Cash and had two children, Carolyn and Maurice. He was a truck driver for Dixie-Ohio Express Company. Cash was a member of United Klans of America, a Ku Klux Klan organization.

Bombing role
Although officially named by the Federal Bureau of Investigation as a suspect as early as 1965, Cash was never formally charged with any crime. He maintained his innocence and passed a polygraph test given by the FBI. Acquaintances claimed that Cash was too nervous to be capable of committing a crime of the magnitude of the bombing.

Cash died in 1994 in Pinson, Alabama.

See also
Thomas Edwin Blanton Jr.
Bobby Frank Cherry
Robert Edward Chambliss
African-American history
Civil Rights Movement
Birmingham campaign
Mass racial violence in the United States

References

Further reading

1918 births
1994 deaths
American Ku Klux Klan members
American truck drivers
Place of birth missing
People from Jefferson County, Alabama